Rignano sull'Arno is a comune (municipality) in the Metropolitan City of Florence in the Italian region Tuscany, located about  southeast of Florence.

Main sights
Pieve of San Lorenzo  a Miransù
Pieve di San Leonino, with a terracotta hexagonal attributed to Santi Buglioni
Monastery of Santa Maria a Rosano, allegedly founded in 780 but known from the 11th century. The church has kept some structures from the 12th century.
Church of San Pietro a Perticaia. It houses a wooden crucifix  of the Florentine school (late 15th-early 16th century)
Church of San Michele a Volognano, included in a castle which is now a neo-Gothic villa. The church houses several artworks, included a late 14th century Madonna with Child by Lorenzo di Bicci, an altarpiece by Mariotto Albertinelli (1514) and the Madonna of the Cintola (c. 1520), attributed to the workshop of Andrea del Sarto, to Domenico Puligo or to Rosso Fiorentino.

References

External links

 Official website

Cities and towns in Tuscany